Wilhelm Cohn  (February 6, 1859, Berlin – August 17, 1913, Charlottenburg) was a German chess master.

He participated in some strong tournaments. In 1897, he tied for 13-14th in Berlin (Rudolf Charousek won). In 1898, he tied for 2nd-4th in Cologne (11th DSB Kongress; Amos Burn won). In 1899, he tied for 10-11th in London (Emanuel Lasker won). In 1900, he took 6th in Munich (12th DSB Kongress; Géza Maróczy, Harry Pillsbury and Carl Schlechter won). In 1902, he took 13th in Hanover (13th DSB Kongress; Dawid Janowski won).

He won several B tournaments at Berlin 1893, Leipzig 1894, Hastings 1895, Eisenach 1896, Berlin 1908, and took 3rd at Barmen 1905. He tied for 2nd-3rd, behind Carl Ahues, at Berlin 1911.

In matches, he lost both to Carl Walbrodt in 1894, and Erhardt Post in 1910.

See also
 List of Jewish chess players

References

External links 
 Chessgames.com database of Wilhelm Cohn's games

German chess players
Jewish chess players
19th-century German Jews
Sportspeople from Berlin
1859 births
1913 deaths
19th-century chess players